Caochangdi was an urban village and renowned arts district located in the Chaoyang District of northeast Beijing at the intersection of the 5th Ring Road and Airport Expressway. Translated as "grasslands" in Mandarin, Caochangdi was home to a diverse group of residents, including migrant workers, farmers, students and artists, most notably, Ai Weiwei. Caochangdi developed into a thriving arts and cultural hub when artists began to move into the area around 2000, attracting international attention similar to the nearby 798 Art Zone. Demolition of the village began in July 2018.

History
Caochangdi has changed dramatically over its history. Once unoccupied grazing land used as hunting grounds by the Imperial Court, it later became an imperial grave and garden site. During the Cultural Revolution, the region became an Agricultural People's Commune and transitioned into a farming village. When the Chinese economy opened up to the global market under Deng Xiaoping, farmers became landlords and began leasing the land to private companies, artists and galleries.

In 2009, the architects Mary-Ann Ray and Robert Mangurian published a book on the village, titled Caochangdi, Beijing Inside Out: Farmers, Floaters, Taxi Drivers, Artists, and the International Art Mob Challenge and Remake the City. It is a study of the village's history and architecture, and includes interviews with Caochangdi residents.

For many years Caochangdi was under threat of demolition. In May 2011, after petitions by its residents and businesses, Chinese authorities officially announced the village would be spared. However, in July 2018 evictions were announced in preparation for demolition And Ai Weiwei's studio was demolished shortly thereafter.

As of February 2019, many of the buildings originally slated for demolition are still standing.

Events
"Caochangdi (CCD) – The Community" was launched on September 28, 2012, as a research-driven program that hosts a series of art, design and technology events throughout Caochangdi. Consisting of gallery exhibitions, public art installations, live events, educational programs, workshops and seminars, CCD – The Community seeks to cultivate the diversity of Caochangdi through long-term curatorial projects.

Spaces in Caochangdi
 Ai Weiwei 258 Fake Studio
 studio O 323 studio O
 artMIA
 Beijing Architecture Studio Enterprise (B.A.S.E.)
 C-Space
 Chambers Fine Art
 Egg Art Gallery
 Galerie Urs Meile
 Harks Gallery
 INK studio
 LI Space
 Pékin Fine Arts
 Platform China
 Taikang Space
 Three Shadows Photography Art Centre
 ShanghART Gallery
 X Gallery
 Forest Studio
 Forest Studio

Notable people living in Caochangdi
 Ai Weiwei (艾未未)
 Enrico Ancilli
 Effi Meridor
 Naihan Li
 Matt Hope
 Li Songsong (李松松)
 He Yunchang
 Zhao Zhao
 Diana Coca (戴安娜 古柯)
 Sun Liangang (孙连刚)

See also
 798 Art Zone
 Pékin Fine Arts

Book references
 Mary-Ann Ray and Robert Mangurian (2009), Caochangdi, Beijing Inside Out: Farmers, Floaters, Taxi Drivers, Artists, and the International Art Mob Challenge and Remake the City. Hong Kong: Timezone 8. .

References

External links
 Caochangdi website
 Reviews of shows
 CCD Workstation
 Fabien Fryns Fine Art
 Pékin Fine Arts gallery
 Galerie Urs Meile
 Platform China
 Diana Coca
 The Fodder Factory Art Cafe

Arts in China
Chinese art
Contemporary art organizations
Ai Weiwei
Chaoyang District, Beijing